The Umin Thonze Pagoda is a Buddhist stupa, located in the Sagaing Hills, Myanmar. The pagoda was founded by King Tarabya I (r. 1327–1335/36) of Sagaing. It was renovated in 1643 and in 1723. In 1838, the pagoda was essentially destroyed by a major earthquake. King Pagan Min (r. 1846–53) rebuilt the pagoda, completing it in 1847. It has a cave with 45 seated Buddha images arranged in a curved formation and behind them decorated with sparkling glass-works.

Notes

References

Bibliography
 
 

Buildings and structures in Sagaing Region
Buddhist temples in Myanmar